Philenora tenuilinea is a moth in the subfamily Arctiinae. It was described by George Hampson in 1914. It is found in Taiwan.

References
Citations

Bibliography

Moths described in 1914
Lithosiini